Hollyoaks is a British television soap opera that was first broadcast on 23 October 1995. The following is a list of characters that appear in 2023, by order of first appearance. All characters are introduced by the soap's executive producer, Lucy Allan. The first characters to make their debuts are best friends Rayne Royce (Jemma Donovan) and Lacey Lloyd (Annabelle Davis).

Rayne Royce
Rayne Royce, played by Jemma Donovan, made her first appearance on 17 January 2023. The character and Donovan's casting details were announced on 12 October 2022. Donovan joins the serial's main cast. Of joining the show, she said: "I am thrilled to be joining the cast of Hollyoaks! I'm so grateful for this opportunity to be able to bring something unique and fun to a new role and I can't wait to be a part of the Hollyoaks family." Donovan relocated to Liverpool for the role, and she told Metro Stephen Patterson that her first day on set was "great" and she felt "at home" straight away. Rayne is part of a new group of 20-somethings living in a share house, which is reminiscent of the show's student-focused earlier years. She and her best friend Lacey Lloyd (Annabelle Davis) move in with Romeo Nightingale (Owen Warner), Nadira Valli (Ashling O'Shea), and Prince McQueen (Malique Thompson-Dwyer). Patterson noted that the pair "waste little time in getting up to no good, causing mischief for a number of the younger residents of the show." 

Rayne was billed as "an outgoing party girl", who is "well-known as a social media sensation." Donovan later described her character as humorous, "fun, fiery and ambitious." She found that she was "diving into a whole new character" in the world of social media, as Rayne is an influencer, adding "I love creating characters and bringing them to life so I'm really looking forward to doing that with Rayne." Donovan later explained that while Rayne is confident and career driven, she would also show "a whole other side" and that she does have a past. She arrives to the village on a motorbike, which Donovan admitted she was not allowed to ride. She confirmed that Rayne has been best friends with Lacey since school and that they have a genuine friendship. Donovan also teased a possible romance with Romeo, after he walks in on her in the bath. She called it "an interesting first encounter for them" and thought it was foreshadowing something between them. She added: "Rayne does turn some heads, and there's a bit of competition too. The first people she meets are Prince, Hunter and then Romeo, but she's mostly there to have fun."

Lacey Lloyd
Lacey Lloyd, played by Annabelle Davis, made her first appearance on 18 January 2023. The character and casting details were announced on 9 December 2022. Of her character and her time with the serial so far, Davis stated: "I'm so excited for you to meet Lacey! She's fun, career driven, training to be a Lawyer and now looking for a job. Fingers crossed she gets it. I've had a great time filming with the Hollyoaks gang and look forward to what Lacey gets up to." Lacey moves into a share house with her best friend Rayne Royce (Jemma Donovan). She was billed as being "fiercely loyal" and a "'great' friend, bringing calm as opposed to Rayne's 'chaos'." Lacey aspires to be a paralegal and her early storylines see her apply for a job at Dee Valley Law.

Rafe Harcourt
Rafe Harcourt, played by Chris Gordon will make his first appearance on 10 May 2023. Rafe is a member of nobility and is the Earl of Dee, who will meet Sienna Blake (Anna Passey) at the Chester Races, where they will strike up a bond, potentially jeopardizing her relationship with Ethan Williams (Matthew James-Bailey).

Speaking about his character and casting, Gordon said: "Joining the team at Hollyoaks feels a bit like meeting the family of a partner you really like – a little bit intimidating, but also very fulfilling. There's a real closeness throughout the departments and I've been welcomed into the fold with grace. Working with Anna  has been an utter joy. Not only as an actor but as a person too. Sienna's journey collides with Rafe and there's... well, fireworks! He's not the usual man around town. The mystery and complexity of a road less travelled is something I'm really looking forward to playing and sharing with the fans."

Dylan

Dylan will make his first appearance in 2023. Although casting details weren't announced about the character, details on him were shared by Hollyoaks executive producer Lucy Allen in an interview with Digital Spy on 11 January 2023. Dylan is the nephew of established character Misbah Maalik (Harvey Virdi), and his arrival will cause Lucas Hay (Oscar Curtis) to begin questioning his sexuality.

Alex
Alex, played by Liz Fletcher, will make her first appearance in 2023. The character and casting was announced on 16 March 2023. Alex is a bank manager for Cindy Cunningham (Stephanie Waring). Speaking about joining the soap, Fletcher said: "It has been so great to join such an iconic show and work with the wonderful talented cast."

Other characters

References

2023
Hollyoaks
, Hollyoaks